Tuguzly (Tuğıźlı) is a rural locality (a village) in Arslanovsky Selsoviet, Kiginsky District, Bashkortostan, Russia. The population was 507 as of 2010. There are 6 streets.

Geography 
Tuguzly is located 19 km southeast of Verkhniye Kigi (the district's administrative centre) by road. Tyoply Klyuch is the nearest rural locality.

References 

Rural localities in Kiginsky District